The Michael-Ann Russell Jewish Community Center or the MARJCC, or as the locals call it "the J", is a Jewish Community Center in the United States. It is located in North Miami Beach, Florida, a suburb of Miami.

Programs and amenities
The MARJCC is a membership organization that offers educational, cultural and physical fitness classes and programs for all ages. 

The youngest members of the MARJCC can start at 2 months of age in the Infant/Toddler Center of our Early Childhood Development Center (ECD). The ECD continues through Preschool and participates the VPK program. The MARJCC also offers a well-structured and supervised After School Program (ASP) for Grades K-5. When school is not in session, these programs run "Mini-Camps."

For over 40 years, South Florida children ages 2-15 have spent their summers on the campus. Camp Sol Taplin is one of the largest and most experienced Jewish summer day camps in the area, featuring more than 20 camp themes with activities for every interest.

Recently added facilities on campus include a gymnastics studio for its competitive and recreational gymnastics programs, Cycling studio, Group and  Private Pilates studios, and additional dance rooms. A new (January 2019) Fitness Center opened and includes all new cardio and weight-training equipment, MX-4 small group circuit training and a Fitness (only) membership option. Campus features include clay and hard court tennis courts, a professional-grade athletic field for soccer and flag football, running track, indoor/outdoor basketball courts, indoor/outdoor heated swimming pools, a gymnasium.  There is also a new 200-seat state-of-the-art theater that can be converted to a special event space.

Cultural Arts programs include (Bamachol) Dance, The Music Academy, Jewish Cultural Arts Theatre (JCAT), and The Visual Arts Academy. Bamachol (in Hebrew means "in the dance") includes ballet, jazz, hip-hop, contemporary and flamenco, as well as Rikudim (Israeli dance)-the largest Israeli dance program in the U.S. JCAT is the educational and performing theatre arm of the MARJCC, a year-round program for youth, teens and adults with productions, theatre camps, and a wide range of classes and workshops in acting, improvisation, and technical theatre.  The Music Academy provides private and small group lessons in drums, guitar, piano, violin, voice (singing) and "How to be a DJ." Classes, beginning at three years of age, can accommodate the very beginner to the most advanced student. The Academy Coordinators are professional musicians and instructors with performance, audio engineering, and publishing awards. The instructors are accomplished musicians in his/her instrument(s) as well as educators. The Visual Arts Program provides educational opportunities and experiences to all ages through courses, workshops, art shows, and exhibitions. The Visual Arts menu includes painting, ceramics, printmaking/screen printing, film-making, graphic design, sculpture, jewelry making and more. Each instructor is accomplished in his/her field - both as an artist and as an educator.

The Hebraica, program for grades K-10, offers to the Jewish community a platform to promote Jewish identity, values, socialization and a love of Israel. Hebraica stresses the importance of family, volunteerism, community involvement, and leadership training. 

The Michael-Ann Russell JCC provides several programs throughout the course of the year to a special needs community -- during the summer months at camp and during the school year in various enrichment programs.

Senior Services provides a variety of educational, physical, social, travel, cultural activities and programs, as well as support group and other services to meet the needs of the older adult population. Programs include Silver Sneakers (health insurance supported) and The Quality of Life (TQOL) program (State of Florida supported).

External links
MAR-JCC Website
Hebraica Miami Website
JCC Association website

Community centers in Florida
Jewish Community Centers in the United States
Jews and Judaism in Miami-Dade County, Florida
North Miami Beach, Florida